Mor Clemis Abraham, the Great Metropolitan of the East (born as Abraham, 1918–2002) was the senior metropolitan (1957–58) of Syriac Orthodox Church. He was in charge of Knanaya Syrian Archdiocese.

Education 
Mor Clemis Abraham did his primary education at the Vaikom Town Government Lower Primary School. His secondary education was in MS Higher Secondary School, Ranni in 1934. and later joined St. Mary's High School in Aluva. He passed his pre-degree from CMS College Kottayam and joined St. Xavier's College, Palayamkottai for Bachelor of Arts. He did his master's degree in political science from Annamalai University, studied Syriac and theology studies at the Theological Seminary in Mosul. In 1960 he obtained a Master of Divinity from Union Theological Seminary in New York City, United States of America.

Ecumenical relations
He had an audience with the pope of Rome at Vatican on July 29, 1960, and on May 14, 1980, Mor Clemis visited the pope again at Vatican with Patriarch Mor Ya`qub III.

Honors
 1982, Patriarch Mor Ignatius Zakka I conferred the title Qooberneeyto Hakeemo (wise captain).
 1989, the title Great Metropolitan of the East by Patriarch Mor Ignatius Zakka I.
 1992, Established a school named after himself: Clemis School and Junior College, Chingavanam, Kottayam, Kerala.

Succession

See also
Syriac Orthodox Church
Jacobite Syrian Christian Church
Mor Sevarios Kuriakose

External links
Qooberneeyto Hakeemo Mor Clemis Abraham, A Tribute from St. Mary's Knanaya Church, 2017

References

Syriac Orthodox Church bishops
Indian Oriental Orthodox Christians
1918 births
2002 deaths
People from Pathanamthitta district